Yenkejeh may refer to:
 Yenkejeh, West Azerbaijan
 Yenkejeh, Zanjan

See also
 Yengijeh (disambiguation)
 Yengejeh (disambiguation)